The Sacramento Wash (California) is the drainage southward, then east from the Lanfair Valley of extreme eastern San Bernardino County, California. The drainage combines with the Piute Wash-(mostly of Nevada) at the south terminus of the Dead Mountains, and immediately enters the Colorado River, just north of Needles, California. Another Sacramento Wash occurs across the Colorado, as an eastern drainage from northwest Arizona, also at Needles, CA.

The Lanfair Valley and Sacramento Wash are at the eastern perimeter region of the Mojave National Preserve.

Geography

The Sacramento Wash (California) is part of a 2-valley south-trending drainage system, shaped like a U; Piute Wash is the eastern part of the drainage; the Sacaramento Wash is the western. The Sacramento Wash turns eastward, combines with other bajada drainages from the west and south, and merges with the Piute Wash, to rapidly descend down from the foothills of the Dead Mountains to the western bank of the Colorado River.

The approximate center of the Sacramento Wash drainage is the center of Lanfair Valley, the Lanfair Buttes.

See also
Piute Wash
Lanfair Valley
Mojave National Preserve
Valleys of San Bernardino County

References

 Lanfair Buttes, coordinates, approx. center of valley, topozone.com

External links
 Lanfair Buttes, Lanfair Valley, approximate north-south center of valley drainage, topozone.com

Lanfair Valley
Mojave National Preserve
Washes of California
Tributaries of the Lower Colorado River in California
Landforms of San Bernardino County, California
Watersheds of California